Bimeks is a Turkish electronics retailer. Traded on the Istanbul stock market the majority shareholding is still with the founding Akgiray family.

Business and activities

Founded in 1990 Bimeks retails IT products, consumer electronics, white goods and small home appliances from 81 stores in 45 cities around Turkey. In 2014 Bimeks acquired the 28 stores of the Darty chain from owners Kesa Turkey.

References

Companies listed on the Istanbul Stock Exchange
Retail companies of Turkey